The GWR 5600 Class is a class of 0-6-2T steam locomotive built between 1924 and 1928. They were designed by Charles Collett for the Great Western Railway (GWR), and were introduced into traffic in 1924. After the 1923 grouping, Swindon inherited a large and variable collection of locomotives from historic Welsh railway companies, which did not fit into their standardisation programme. GWR boiler inspectors arrived en masse and either condemned the original locomotives or had them rebuilt. The systematic destruction of many examples of locomotives, most still in serviceable condition, followed, but various were worked alongside 5600 Class. 

Two hundred GWR 5600 Class replacement locomotives were built and remained in service until withdrawn by British Railways between 1962 and 1965. Nine of the class have survived into preservation.

Background: Welsh 0-6-2T types
The railways of South Wales seem to have had a particular liking for the 0-6-2T type.  This was because the nature of the work they undertook demanded high adhesive weight, plenty of power with good braking ability, but no need for outright speed, nor large tanks or bunker as the distances from pit to port were short. The 0-6-2 configuration was discovered to confidently handle the sharp curves so prevalent in the area. These Welsh locomotives were taken over by the GWR at the Grouping in 1922, as follows:

Some were rebuilt with GWR taper boilers. In 1946, all of the surviving B&M locomotives and several TVR locomotives were allotted new numbers, which were applied between 1946 and 1950 (although some were withdrawn before the new number could be applied).  A number of them passed into British Railways (BR) ownership in 1948, including (with some gaps in numbering):
 Alexandra (Newport and South Wales) Docks and Railway, BR number 190
 Barry Railway, BR numbers 198–277
 Brecon and Merthyr Tydfil Junction Railway, BR numbers 422-436
 Cardiff Railway, BR number 155
 Port Talbot Railway and Docks, BR number 184
 Rhymney Railway, BR numbers 30-83
 Taff Vale Railway, BR numbers 200–411
Of the Taff Vale Railway, many engines continued to operate up to the 1950s, but today only two locomotives survived, TVR 'O1' No.28, the last-surviving Welsh-built engine, and TVR 'O2' No.85.

For further information on these pre-grouping locomotives see Locomotives of the Great Western Railway.

Origins
When the GWR took over the Welsh valley lines, they discovered that the Welsh locomotive crews liked their 0-6-2T locomotives. Rather than a new design the 5600 Class was a "Swindonised" version of the Rhymney Railway M class and R class locomotives. The 1904 M class (and the similar 1909 R class) were successful designs ideally suited to hauling heavy coal trains a relatively short distance.

The 5600 Class was specially designed for work in South Wales, replacing the elderly, worn-out locomotives that had been 'inherited' in 1923, when the smaller railway companies were forcibly merged into the GWR at The Grouping.  Contrary to this trend, the Rhymney Railway's more modern 0-6-2s were in generally good order and had proved successful. Thus they became the blueprint for the 56xx.

The first of five R class locos was re-boilered by the GWR in 1926 and a single M class was upgraded in 1930. In this form, both were visually almost indistinguishable from the 5600 Class.

Design
The design of the 5600 Class followed Great Western Railway practice as far as possible, by utilising many standardised parts. Included in Churchward's innovations was a Standard Number 2 boiler which was suitable for the 5600 Class, and the M and R class Rhymney locomotives, complete with the traditional brass GWR safety valve casing and copper-capped chimney.

They were substantial sized tank engines, 37 feet 6 inches in length and weighing 62 tons. The side tanks were capable of holding 1900 gallons of water. The high domed cab, bunker and tanks were closely related to the 31xx and 42xx classes. One hundred of the class were built at the GWR workshops in Swindon from 1924 to 1927.

While they were powerful machines, the 5600s were very unpopular with footplate crews at the time. They were beset by numerous failures, the most common of which was hot axle boxes. They lacked the wider tolerances in their boxes that the original Welsh company locomotives had. They also had the tendency to derail, so those driving them preferred them in reverse, where the pony truck was able to guide them around tight curves. When the first batch were hastily recalled back to Swindon, Collett faced criticism from the Director of Caerphilly Works in building such a locomotive unsuited to the lines they were meant to work on. 

In 1927 another 100 similar engines were constructed – these were slightly heavier and numbered in the 66xx series. Nos 6600–6649 were Swindon-built in 1927–1928, but due to the pressure of work 6650–6699 were built by Armstrong Whitworth in 1928. This resulted in some minor design differences from the Swindon locomotives, most visible were additional balance weights fitted inside the driving wheels webs opposite the crank pin to remedy the faults. When the Welsh railwaymen discovered that the new GWR 5700 Class 0-6-0 pannier tank (introduced 1929) was even more suitable for the same work – being shorter and lighter, with roughly the same (slightly lower) tractive effort – no further Class 56xx/66xx locos were built.

The 5600 Class had the distinction of being the only locomotive of 0-6-2 wheel arrangement built new by the GWR.   Nevertheless, there were just over 400 locos with that wheel arrangement in service from 1940 to 1945, demonstrating the large number acquired in 1923.

Dimensions
 Locomotive weight: 
 All locos, 68 tons 12 cwt
 5600 Class, 68 tons 12 cwt
 6600 Class, 69 tons 7 cwt
 5600 Class, 62 tons 18 cwt
 6600 Class, 15 cwt more than 5600

Service

A fall in the South Wales coal trade in the 1930s saw many of the class re-allocated to other parts of the system. Due to the stability of the design, many drivers would typically operate the 56xx class down the Welsh valleys in reverse (bunker first). The placement of the trailing wheels helped the engine enter the curves better than if operated in the other direction.  Typically, during operation, when pulling a heavy load the tanks were operated bunker first, and then smokebox first on the return trips up the valleys.

All the 56xx/66xx locomotives passed into British Railways ownership at nationalisation in 1948, and all remained in service until 1962, at which time they were withdrawn from service quite rapidly, with the onset of diesel traction on BR gaining momentum.  All had been retired by 1965.

Withdrawal 

Withdrawn from 1962 to 1966, with nos. 5605 and 6697 being the last to go.

Preservation 

Several ended up in Woodham Brothers' scrapyard in Barry, South Wales, with eight of the nine preserved engines saved from Barry. The majority of the class in preservation were built at Swindon Works, three of them: 6686, 6695 & 6697 being built by Armstrong Whitworth.

As the locomotives were operated mainly in South Wales, some railfans know the Class by the nickname "Taffy Tank"; 'Taffy' being a derogatory term for someone of Welsh descent. However, the 56xx class never had this title officially, whereas the more typical examples of the Rhymney Railway's M and R classes they replaced, were arguably the original 'Taffy Tanks' of fame.

As of 2017, six members of the class have run in preservation, with three engines currently in operation, 5668 undergoing restoration from scrapyard condition at the Kent and East Sussex Railway, 6634 and 6686 both awaiting restoration from scrapyard condition at Peak Rail and the Barry Tourist Railway respectively, and 6697 on static display at Didcot Railway Centre.
  
The following table lists the preserved locomotives:

References

External links 

 5600 class (Great Western Archive)
 No. 5637 (5637 Steam Locomotive Group)
 No. 5643 (Furness Railway Trust)
 No. 6619 (Kent & East Sussex Railway)
 No. 6695 (Swanage Railway)

5600 Class
0-6-2T locomotives
Armstrong Whitworth locomotives
Railway locomotives introduced in 1924
Freight locomotives
Standard gauge steam locomotives of Great Britain